María de la Fuente (born February 9, 1977, in Mexico City, Mexico) is a Mexican actress.

She began her studies of acting preparation in the Actoral Training Center of TV Azteca. Her career began has intervened in several television commercials, apart from her small roles in television.

In 2008, she participates in telenovela Pobre rico, pobre. In 2010 she acts beside of Christian Bach in telenovela Vidas robadas.

In 2017 returns in television at the telenovela La Piloto.

Filmography

References

External links 
 

1977 births
Living people
Mexican telenovela actresses
Mexican television actresses
Mexican female models
Actresses from Mexico City
21st-century Mexican actresses
People from Mexico City
21st-century Mexican singers